Hassagers Kollegium (originally Hassagers Collegium with 1900 orthography) is a small dormitory located at Frederiksberg Bredegade 13 B 2000 Frederiksberg, Denmark (Location:). The name simply means Hassager's dormitory.

It has 10 small single rooms (12 square meters each) which may only be rented by students from the University of Copenhagen who have passed exams equivalent to two years of study. Through the years, about 340 students have lived at the Kollegium. The mix of students from different faculties and the fact that only older students are admitted have created a dormitory with a relatively calm atmosphere.

The Kollegium was founded by Dorthea Hassager in remembrance of her late husband, the priest Carl Hassager, and it was inaugurated on 25 September 1900. It is the youngest of the old dormitories of the University of Copenhagen.

The kollegium has an Ephorus Colegii who, in return for doing the administrative duties such as admitting new students and managing the economy of the dormitory, lives for free in the nearby old townhouse where Dorthea Hassager originally lived. The current ephorus is John Edelsgaard Andersen, PhD who is also the director of the International Office of the University of Copenhagen. Only a person who works at the university may become ephorus. The title ephorus is derived from the Greek ephoros which has been vulgarized into Latin.

The dormitory also has a janitor who takes care of the more practical aspects of managing the dorm.

After the Second World War (in 1950) Hassagers Kollegium became integrated into the newly built 4. maj kollegiet (The 4th of May Dormitory). The old dormitory was torn down, and Hassagers Kollegium now shares building and ephorus with the new dormitory. The traditions of Hassagers Collegium live on, and application for the two dormitories remains separate (4. maj kollegiet is for children and grandchildren of the Danish freedom fighters during the War).

External links
  Joint homepage of Hassagers Kollegium and 4. maj Kollegiet på Frederiksberg (in Danish) 

University and college residential buildings in Copenhagen